Barbara Ann Underhill (born June 24, 1963) is a Canadian former pair skater. With partner Paul Martini, she is the 1984 World champion, the 1979–1983 Canadian national champion, and the 1978 World Junior champion. They represented Canada at the 1980 Winter Olympics, where they placed 9th, and at the 1984 Winter Olympics, where they placed 7th. In 2009, she was named to the World Figure Skating Hall of Fame. Since retiring, Underhill has worked as a skating coach for ice hockey players.

Career

Partnership with Martini 
Underhill/Martini won gold at the 1978 World Junior Championships in Megève, France, ahead of Jana Blahová / Ludek Feno of Czechoslovakia. In 1979, they won their first senior national title and made their World Championship debut, finishing 11th. They placed 9th at the 1980 Winter Olympics in Lake Placid, New York.

Underhill/Martini finished fourth at the 1982 World Championships in Copenhagen, having placed fifth in the short program and fourth in the free skate. The pair reached the podium at the 1983 World Championships in Helsinki. After placing third in both segments, they were awarded the bronze medal behind Elena Valova / Oleg Vasiliev of the Soviet Union and Sabine Baeß / Tassilo Thierbach of East Germany.

In February 1984, Underhill/Martini finished 7th at the Winter Olympics in Sarajevo. In March, they competed at the 1984 World Championships in Ottawa. Ranked second to Olympic gold medalists Valova/Vasiliev in the short program and first in the free skate, Underhill/Martini won Canada's first world figure skating title since Karen Magnussen in 1973.

Later career 
Underhill worked for 16 years as a skating TV commentator until 2006. She then began working with hockey players to develop their speed and power. Underhill initially worked with the Guelph Storm, of which her husband Rick Gaetz is a part owner. She then began working with NHL teams—first the Anaheim Ducks, followed by the New York Rangers and the Tampa Bay Lightning. Underhill was named in the 2011 edition of The Hockey News's list of the 100 most influential people in ice hockey due to her power skating coaching. Underhill joined the National Hockey League's Toronto Maple Leafs as the team's Skating Consultant on April 20, 2012.

Underhill also appeared on CBC TV's Battle of the Blades.

Personal life 
Underhill was born in Pembroke, Ontario, Canada. Underhill married Rick Gaetz, with whom she has two sons, Matthew and Scott, all of whom are involved in hockey. On September 15, 1992, she had twin girls, Sam and Stephanie, but lost Stephanie in a drowning accident on Saturday, May 29, 1993, hours before Game 7 between Los Angeles Kings and Toronto Maple Leafs at Maple Leaf Gardens. In 1998, she started the Stephanie Gaetz Keepsafe Foundation to reduce injuries in childhood, with a focus on water safety.

Competitive highlights
(with Martini)

References

External links

 Stephanie Gaetz Keepsafe Foundation – Organization in memory of her late daughter
 Pairs on Ice: Barbara Underhill & Paul Martini
 
 
 
 

1963 births
Living people
Canadian female pair skaters
Battle of the Blades participants
Figure skaters at the 1980 Winter Olympics
Figure skaters at the 1984 Winter Olympics
Olympic figure skaters of Canada
Sportspeople from Oshawa
Skating people from Ontario
World Figure Skating Championships medalists
World Junior Figure Skating Championships medalists